Archery at the 2014 Summer Youth Olympics was held from 22 to 26 August. The events took place at the Fangshan Sports Training Base in Nanjing, China.

Qualification
Each National Olympic Committee (NOC) could enter a maximum of 2 competitors, 1 per each gender. As hosts, China was given the maximum quota, however they declined the spot for the boys' event and thus the spot was reallocated to the next best nation at the 2013 World Archery Youth Championships. A further 8 spots, 4 in each gender was to be decided by the Tripartite Commission, but only 5 were given. The next three sports, followed by the remaining 54 spots were decided by qualification events at the previous world youth championships  and the five continental qualification tournaments.

To be eligible to participate at the 2014 Youth Olympics, athletes must have been born between 1 January 1997 and 31 December 1999. Furthermore, all archers must have achieved the following Minimum Qualification Score (MQS):

 Men: FITA round of 1220 or 60m round of 610
 Women: FITA round of 1200 or 60m round of 600

The MQS must be achieved between 1 September 2013 and 1 July 2014 at a registered FITA event.

Boys

Girls

Schedule

The schedule was released by the Nanjing Youth Olympic Games Organizing Committee.

All times are CST (UTC+8)

Medal summary

Medal table

Results

References

External links
Official Results Book – Archery

 
2014 Summer Youth Olympics events
Youth Summer Olympics
2014
International archery competitions hosted by China